The men's field hockey tournament at the 2018 Asian Games was held at the Gelora Bung Karno Hockey Field, Jakarta, Indonesia, from 20 August to 1 September 2018.

Competition schedule

Qualification

Squads

Pools composition
Teams were seeded following the serpentine system according to their FIH World Ranking as of July 2018.

Preliminary round
All times are local Indonesia Western Standard Time (UTC+7).

Pool A

Pool B

Final round

Classification round

Eleventh place game

Ninth place game

Seventh place game

Fifth place game

Medal round

Semi-finals

Bronze medal match

Gold medal match

Statistics

Final standings

 Qualified for the 2020 Summer Olympics as hosts

Goalscorers

See also
Field hockey at the 2018 Asian Games – Women's tournament

References

External links

 
Men
Asian Games
2018